This is a list of episodes of the 2006 Japanese animated television series . The episodes were directed by Keizō Kusakawa, and animated by the Japanese animation studio Seven Arcs. The series was based on the light novel version of the same name, and followed the story of a dog goddess named Yōko and her master Keita Kawahira as they fight against various troublesome spirits.

The televised series aired on the TV Tokyo Japanese television network between 6 April 2006 and 28 September 2006 comprising twenty-six episodes. Four pieces of theme music were used in the anime, one opening theme, and three ending themes. The episodes were released on nine DVD compilations released between 9 August 2006 and 4 April 2007 in limited edition versions, and between 4 October 2006 and 6 June 2007 in regular versions; the first volume contained two episodes, while each of the subsequent volumes contained three episodes.

Episode list

Film

References

External links
Anime official website 

Inukami!